Verkhniye Lekandy (Ürge Läkände; , Yuğarı Lekände) is a rural locality (a village) in Nagadaksky Selsoviet, Aurgazinsky District, Bashkortostan, Russia. The population was 72 as of 2010. There is 1 street.

Geography 
Verkhniye Lekandy is located 41 km northeast of Tolbazy (the district's administrative centre) by road. Uteymullino is the nearest rural locality.

References 

Rural localities in Aurgazinsky District